Jeremy Matthew Danker (born 20 February 1984) is a former Malaysian footballer.

Career

Public Bank FC 
Jeremy started his semi pro career with the now defunct Public Bank FC after he was introduced to the club. Due to his young age at that time, Jeremy was not given any appearance for the team.

Perak UPB my/team 

Jeremy moved to another now defunct Malaysian Super League team UPB MyTeam after a successful open trial under a reality TV series MyTeam launched in 2006. UPB MyTeam was then invited to join the Malaysian Premier League for 2007 season where they finished the season as runners up and thus, was promoted to the Malaysian Super League for the 2008 season.

Kuala Lumpur FA 
After MyTeam was disbanded, Jeremy moved on and played for Kuala Lumpur FA. He was a regular starter for the team until some miscommunication led him to sign for Sabah FA during the transfer window.

Sabah FA 
Jeremy suffered a new blow when he did not manage to appear for Sabah FA in the remainder games of the league. His contract was then terminated unlawfully by Sabah FA and the case is currently pending settlement from both parties.

Johor United 
Jeremy moved on with Johor United for the 2011/2012 season in the Malaysia Premier League. He had a fruitful pre-season start for the club after appearing regularly and scored on several occasion. Despite the bright start, Jeremy was only given less than a handful appearance for the club and left the club after serving his contract.

Kuala Lumpur FA 
Jeremy moved back to Kuala Lumpur FA for the 2013 season in the Malaysian Premier League which also saw Kuala Lumpur FA being demoted to FAM Cup for the 2013/2014 season.

References 

 
 thestar.com.my
 newsabahtimes.com.my
 nst.com.my

External links 
 https://web.archive.org/web/20121126035032/http://www.klfa.com.my/

1984 births
Living people
Malaysian footballers
Association football defenders 
Association football forwards
Kuala Lumpur City F.C. players
Sabah F.C. (Malaysia) players